Trelew is a hamlet in south west Cornwall in England, United Kingdom. It is in the civil parish of Mylor. The hamlet is situated on the south shore of the tidal Mylor Creek, an inlet on the west side of Carrick Roads. 

Trelew lies within the Cornwall Area of Outstanding Natural Beauty (AONB).

A fictionalised version of Trelew appears in the animated film Arthur Christmas (2011) as the hometown of the character Gwen.

References

Hamlets in Cornwall